Jimmy Hughes, Rookie Cop is an American crime show that aired on the DuMont Television Network from May 8 to July 3, 1953. The show starred William Redfield, later Conrad Janis, in the title role of Jimmy Hughes. The series was written by Bruce Geller, later famous as the creator of the TV series Mission: Impossible.

Episode status
Only one episode of the series survives, the network premiere on May 8, 1953, which is held at the UCLA Film and Television Archive.

See also
List of programs broadcast by the DuMont Television Network
List of surviving DuMont Television Network broadcasts

References

Bibliography
David Weinstein, The Forgotten Network: DuMont and the Birth of American Television (Philadelphia: Temple University Press, 2004) 
Alex McNeil, Total Television, Fourth edition (New York: Penguin Books, 1980) 
Tim Brooks and Earle Marsh, The Complete Directory to Prime Time Network TV Shows, Third edition (New York: Ballantine Books, 1964)

External links
 
 DuMont historical website

1953 American television series debuts
1953 American television series endings
1950s American crime drama television series
Black-and-white American television shows
DuMont Television Network original programming
English-language television shows